Mitchell David Rao (born 3 April 1997) is a Scottish cricketer. He made his first-class debut for Scotland against Ireland in the 2015–17 ICC Intercontinental Cup on 29 November 2017. Prior to his first-class debut, he was named in Scotland's squad for the 2016 Under-19 Cricket World Cup.

References

External links
 

1997 births
Living people
Scottish cricketers
Cricketers from Glasgow
Alumni of the University of Glasgow